Moutaiz Al-Obaidi, known professionally as Motez, is an Australian record producer, musician and DJ. Motez was a refugee born in Iraq and moved to Adelaide in 2006. Motez's Song "The Future" featuring Antony and Cleopatra was certified Platinum in Australia. He has won several South Australian Music Awards for Best Solo Artist (2021) and Most Popular Electronic Artist (2016, 2018, 2020 and 2021)

Touring
Motez has performed at many festivals including: Splendour in the Grass, Falls Festival, Warehouse Project and Electric Forest Festival. He embarked on his own headline tour in 2017 with Tigerilla and Mickey Kojak as supports.

Soulitude 
In the wake of lockdown restrictions and the cancelation of live events due to the Coronavirus pandemic, Motez released an introspective, ambient EP called Soulitude which was conceived as a "response to the global mindset of isolation". The project was touted as a "raw, minimal and emotive ambient work, encompassing his own experiences and the natural human responses to seclusion." To commemorate the release of Soulitude, Motez played and recorded a live set of the entire EP in Fleurieu Peninsula, South Australia which was streamed online through United We Stream, the event was a set up to raise funds for Support Act. and garnered over 25,000 plays in the first day  and won Best Video and Best Release at the 2020 SA Music Awards.

Live Show 
Motez debuted his live show at Womad Festival on March 12, 2022. The show featured live instrumentation by string and brass sections, kids' choir as well as guest vocalists including George Alice. The show was subsequently broadcast on Triple J as part of their 'Live at the Wireless' series which aired in May 2022. The show was dubbed as "a spectacular combination of powerful dance beats with a stunning light show" by the AU Review. In an interview with Roland, Motez said "I first attended Womadelaide soon after moving to Australia and I dreamt of playing there one day. I understood that the stakes were high, the calibre of musicianship and showmanship was incredible, so I thought if I ever put on a show there it must be more than just about music. It has to be an audio-visual experience matched with a lot of live instrumentation. I am a musician first and foremost, and so presenting my live show for the first time at Womadelaide I had go all out."

Discography

Singles
 Raves Are Dead (2010)
 A Trick Or Two / Makes Me Itch (2010)
 Hard Times (2011)
 Ride Roof Back / Take Off (2013)
 Promise Me / Bodyrock (2014)
 Own Up (2014)
 Down Like This feat. Tkay Maidza (2016)
 Praise / Fire Burning (2017)
 The Future feat. Antony & Cleopatra (2017)
 Roll Out (2018)
 Steady Motion feat. KWAYE (2019)
Toggle (2019)
Where Have You Been (2019)
 Patience (2020)
 Slow Down (2020) 
 Give Your Heart Away (2020) 
Andes (2021)
Give Me Space feat. The Kite String Tangle (2021)
ReSet (2021)
Submission (2022) 
Get it Done feat. Scrufizzer (2022)

EPs
 Call My Name EP (2013)
 No Need To Panic (2014)
 Vancouver (2015)
 The Vibe EP (2016)
 Late Thoughts EP (2018)
 Soulitude (2020) 
ReSet (2021)

Remixes

 Flume feat. Caroline Polachek - Sirens (Motez Remix)

 Client Liaison - Elevator Up (Motez Remix)
Icarus (band) – Sirens (Motez Remix)
Northeast Party House - Shelf Life (Motez Remix)
Tensnake - Rules (Motez Remix)
The Kite String Tangle - North (Motez Remix)
 Karma Fields - Colorblind ft. Tove Lo (Motez Remix)
 Peking Duk – Wasted (Motez Remix)
 Allen French – Nova Vida (Motez Remix)
 Flight Facilities – Sunshine feat. Reggie Watts (Motez Remix)
 Sam Smith – Leave Your Lover (Motez Remix)
 Disclosure – Omen (Motez Remix) [feat. Sam Smith]
 Panama – Jungle (Motez Remix)
 Flight Facilities – Clair de Lune (Motez Remix)
 Owl Eyes – Open Up (Motez Remix)
 Tyler Touché – Heart in Motion (Motez Remix)
 Madison Avenue – Don't Call Me Baby (Motez Remix)
 Gary Richards – "All Nite" ft. E-40 & Too $hort (Motez Remix)
 Rufus Du Sol – Desert Night (Motez Remix)
 Ellie Goulding – Beating Heart (Motez Remix)

Awards

South Australian Music Awards
The South Australian Music Awards (previously known as the Fowler's Live Music Awards) are annual awards that exist to recognise, promote and celebrate excellence in the South Australian contemporary music industry. They commenced in 2012.
 
|-
| 2016
| Motez
| Best Producer
| 
|- 
| 2017
| Motez
| Most Popular Electronic Artist 
| 
|- 
| 2018
| Motez
| Most Popular Electronic Artist 
| 
|- 
| rowspan="3" | 2020
| rowspan="2" |"Soulitude" by Motez 
| Best Release 
| 
|-
| Best Music Video
| 
|-  
| Motez
| People's Choice Electronic Artist
| 
|- 
| rowspan="2" | 2021
| Motez
| Best Solo
| 
|- 
| Motez
| Best Electronic
| 
|-

References

External links

 on SoundCloud
Motez on Instagram

Australian musicians
Living people
Australian electronic musicians
Australian house musicians
Australian DJs
Electronic dance music DJs
Year of birth missing (living people)